Hermann Fillitz (20 April 1924 – 14 June 2022) was an Austrian art historian.

References

1924 births
2022 deaths
Austrian art historians
Academic staff of the University of Vienna
Academic staff of the University of Basel
Members of the Austrian Academy of Sciences
Members of the Polish Academy of Learning